The Peterborough Stars were a Junior "A" ice hockey team from Peterborough, Ontario, Canada. They played in the Ontario Junior Hockey League. All players from Peterborough that remain junior eligible will have their player cards sent to the Lindsay Muskies as the Stars merged into the Lindsay Muskies.

History
The franchise started in the Ontario Hockey Association's Eastern Junior B Hockey League in 1960 and ended in 2012 when the Stars folded and merged into the Lindsay Muskies.

The Peterborough Lions competed in the 1970 Ontario Winter Games.  The Games were meant to represent all four major regions of Jr. B hockey in Ontario.  The Lions were crowned Ontario Jr. B Grand Champions by defeating the Toronto Nationals, Chapleau Huskies, Brockville Tikis, St. Marys Lincolns, Owen Sound Greys, St. Catharines Falcons, and the Petrolia Jets 7-1 in the Gold Medal Game.

In 1972, all Ontario junior hockey experienced a reshuffle and the Lions found themselves in the Metro Junior "B" League. The Lions took a 3-year hiatus from 1975 to 1978, returning as the Hall Oil Lumber Kings. Renamed the Roadrunners in 1984, the team went a record 37 games without a win during the 1987-88 season (and 44 games overall going into the 1988-89 season, which ended on October 31, 1988). The franchise stayed with the Metro until it went renegade and left the Ontario Hockey Association in 1989. In 1989, the Peterborough Roadrunners jumped to the Central Junior "B" league, which became the Ontario Provincial Junior A Hockey League in 1993. The Stars were known as the Peterborough Bees from 1997 until 2005. They became the Stars in 2005. They are affiliated with the Peterborough Petes of the Ontario Hockey League.

After over half of a century of hockey, the Stars shutdown operation by merging with the Lindsay Muskies in the Spring of 2012.

Season-by-season results

Notable alumni
 Zac Bierk
 Cody Ceci
 Jassen Cullimore
 Tie Domi
 Mike Fisher
 Bob Gainey
 Aaron Gavey
 Kerry Huffman
 Jeff Larmer
 Steve Larmer
 Darren McCarty
 Dave Roche
 Glen Seabrooke
 Cory Stillman
 Steve Webb

External links
 Stars Webpage

Ontario Provincial Junior A Hockey League teams
1950s establishments in Ontario
2012 disestablishments in Ontario
Sports clubs established in the 1950s
Ice hockey clubs disestablished in 2012
Sport in Peterborough, Ontario